East Margaretsville is a community in the Canadian province of Nova Scotia, located in  Annapolis County. It is situated on the side of North Mountain, overlooking the Bay of Fundy.

References

Communities in Annapolis County, Nova Scotia